Parish council may refer to:

Parish councils in England
Civil parishes in Scotland
Parochial church council
Pastoral council (Roman Catholic Church)